Manaurie is a former commune in the Dordogne department in Nouvelle-Aquitaine in southwestern France. On 1 January 2019, it was merged into the new commune Les Eyzies.

Population

See also
Communes of the Dordogne department

References

Former communes of Dordogne
Populated places disestablished in 2019